Joseph George Sabol (November 7, 1936 – December 25, 1998) was an American football player and coach. He was a three-time letter winner at Penn State. He served as the head football coach at Norwich University in Northfield, Vermont from 1964 to 1975 and at Gettysburg College in Gettysburg, Pennsylvania from 1975 to 1979, compiling a career college football coaching record of 57–53–1.

References

External links
 

1936 births
1998 deaths
Norwich Cadets football coaches
Gettysburg Bullets football coaches
Penn State Nittany Lions football players
People from Shamokin, Pennsylvania
Players of American football from Pennsylvania